The Best of HOCC is a Cantopop album by Denise Ho, released by EMI on November 20, 2004.

Songs
畸后 (Insane Queen)
Happy Ending
一秒 - 何韻詩/方力申/Mini  (One Second) (Featuring HOCC, Alex Fong, Mini)
迷你與我 (Mini and Me)
水花四濺 (Water Splashing)
天使藍 (Angel Blue)
勁愛你 - 何韻詩/Shine (Love you Heaps) (Featuring HOCC, Shine)
Shampoo
Ecoutez-moi
再見...露絲瑪莉 (Goodbye...Rosemary)
我會選擇C (I would pick "C")
兄弟 (Brother)
我找到了 (I found it)
絕對 (Absolute)
娃鬼回魂 (Ghost of a Ghost)
元神出竅 (Soul Out)
沙 (恆河協奏曲) Sand) (Universal Performance Piece)

See also
 HOCC WEB! The Best of HOCC

Denise Ho albums
2004 greatest hits albums